The 2002–03 Israeli Women's Cup (Gvia HaMedina Nashim) was the 5th season of Israel's women's nationwide football cup competition.

The competition was won by Maccabi Holon who had beaten Maccabi Haifa 3–2 after extra time in the final.

Results

First round

Quarter-finals

Semi-finals

Final

References
Women's State Cup 2002/3 Women's Football in Israel 

Israel Women's Cup seasons
Cup
Israel